The 1936 Dunbartonshire by-election was held on 18 March 1936.  The by-election was held due to the appointment as Governor of Burma of the incumbent Conservative MP, Archibald Douglas Cochrane.  It was won by the Labour candidate Thomas Cassells.

References

1936 in Scotland
1930s elections in Scotland
Politics of the Dunbartonshire
1936 elections in the United Kingdom
By-elections to the Parliament of the United Kingdom in Scottish constituencies